Sundown is Canadian singer Gordon Lightfoot's tenth original album, released in 1974 on the Reprise Records label. It reached No. 1 in the US on the pop chart, the only Lightfoot album to achieve this. In his native Canada, it topped the RPM 100 for five consecutive weeks, first hitting No. 1 on June 22, 1974, the same day it reached the top on the south of the border.

The album marked the pinnacle of Lightfoot's acoustic folk-country blend before he embarked on an increasing use of electric instruments, although he did include some electric guitar, notably on the title track.

As for singles, the title track reached No. 1 on the pop and adult contemporary charts as well as #13 on the country chart, while "Carefree Highway" reached No. 10 on the pop chart, No. 1 on the AC chart and No. 81 on the country chart.

Track listing
All compositions by Gordon Lightfoot.

Side 1 (LP)
"Somewhere U.S.A." – 2:50
"High and Dry" – 2:12
"Seven Island Suite" – 6:00
"Circle of Steel" – 2:45
"Is There Anyone Home" – 3:15

Side 2 (LP)
"The Watchman's Gone" – 4:25
"Sundown" – 3:45
"Carefree Highway" – 3:45
"The List" – 3:00
"Too Late for Prayin'" – 4:15

Compact cassette (rep ms 2177) was issued in 1974 with the following track list:

Side 1 (Cassette, TT: 18:43)
"Sundown" 
"Somewhere U.S.A." 
"Seven Island Suite"
"Circle of Steel"
"Is There Anyone Home"

Side 2 (Cassette, TT: 17:50)
"High and Dry" 
"The Watchman's Gone" 
"Carefree Highway" 
"The List" 
"Too Late for Prayin'"

Chart performance

Certifications

Personnel
Gordon Lightfoot – lead and backing vocals, 6- and 12-string acoustic guitars, high-strung guitar Nashville tuning, chimes, bells,
Red Shea – electric, acoustic and classical guitars, dobro, slide dobro (tracks 1–5, 7, 9, 10)
Terry Clements – acoustic guitar (tracks 1, 3–10)
Rick Haynes – bass guitar (tracks 1, 4, 8, 9)
John Stockfish – bass guitar (tracks 2, 3, 5–7, 10)
Nick De Caro – accordion, horns, orchestration, piano, strings (tracks 3, 5, 6, 8, 10)
Gene Martynec – Moog synthesizer (tracks 3, 5)
Jim Gordon – drums, percussion (tracks 1–3, 5–9)
Milt Holland – percussion, congas (tracks 1, 5, 6, 9)
Catherine Smith – harmony vocals (track 2)
Jack Zaza – English horn, recorder (track 4)

References

External links
Album lyrics and chords

Gordon Lightfoot albums
1974 albums
Albums produced by Lenny Waronker
Reprise Records albums